Tell is an unincorporated community in southwestern Childress County, Texas, United States, to the southwest of the city of Childress, the county seat of Childress County.  Its elevation is 1,903 feet (580 m).  It has a post office with the ZIP code 79259.

Notable person

Walt Faulkner, who in 1950 became the first rookie to win the pole position for the Indianapolis 500, was born in Tell and lived there for the first two-and-one-half years of his life.

Churches
The little community once supported three churches: Methodist, Church of Christ, and Baptist. However, the only one remaining is Tell Southside Baptist Church.

References

Unincorporated communities in Childress County, Texas
Unincorporated communities in Texas